Karunya Institute of Technology and Sciences, formerly Karunya University, is a NAAC A++ Grade accredited private residential institute deemed to be university in Coimbatore, Tamil Nadu, India. It was founded by D. G. S. Dhinakaran and his son Paul Dhinakaran.

Accreditation
Karunya University was accredited in 2022 by the National Assessment and Accreditation Council (NAAC) with an "A++" grade.

National Institutional Ranking Framework (NIRF) instituted by MHRD, Govt of India, has ranked Karunya Institute of Technology and Sciences (Deemed to be University) among the top 100 universities in the year 2019.

a)	KITS is ranked 72nd under Engineering institutions category and 
b)	92nd under University category.

The university was ranked in the 101–150 and among universities in India by the National Institutional Ranking Framework (NIRF) in 2020, in the 101–150 band overall and 80 among the engineering rankings.

The B.Tech. programs in Civil Engineering, Mechanical Engineering, Electronics and Communication, Computer Science and Engineering, Biotechnology and PG programmes MBA, Structural Engineering, VLSI Design, Biotechnology & Computer Science and Engineering were awarded NBA accreditation for a period of three years.

References

External links 
 

Engineering colleges in Coimbatore
Deemed universities in India
1986 establishments in Tamil Nadu
Educational institutions established in 1986